Saint Julian is the third solo album by Julian Cope. It has a very strong pop sound, compared to other Cope releases, and spawned several of his best known tracks (including "World Shut Your Mouth" and "Trampolene", which were both hit singles).

Background 
Saint Julian was the first album recorded under a new Cope deal with Island Records, following two poorly selling albums on the Mercury/Polygram label. Encouraged by his new manager Cally Callomon, Cope cleaned up and changed his image: cutting his hair, wearing rocker's leathers and embracing a "Rock God" perspective, as well as investing in a bizarre climbable microphone stand with integral steps.

To record and tour the album, Cope put together a new backing group, informally known as the "Two-Car Garage Band". This featured lead guitarist Donald Ross Skinner and former Waterboys drummer Chris Whitten (both of whom had played on Cope's previous album Fried), plus bass player James Eller (who'd played alongside Cope on the second Teardrop Explodes album, Wilder) and Cope himself on vocals and rhythm guitar. Also credited on the album was keyboardist Double DeHarrison; promotional material of the era (which gave some background detail on each band member) indicated that DeHarrison was from Oregon, and had previously scored several "art sex" films and played in the late 1970s German group Tin Haus.  In fact, Double DeHarrison was an alias for Cope himself, and "Tin Haus" (and the films DeHarrison was said to have scored) were entirely fictitious.  Cope also used the De Harrison pseudonym for the "Oregon guitar" playing on "A Crack in the Clouds" (the slow fingerpicked continuo) and would go on to use it again on subsequent solo albums.  For live shows of the era, Richard Frost joined the band on keyboards, "replacing" DeHarrison.

Several songs on the album originated from much earlier than the others. "Screaming Secrets" had been a Teardrop Explodes song which never made it to album, while "Spacehopper" may date back to late 1970s writing sessions with Ian McCulloch (although only Cope was credited as songwriter).

The album's new songs abandoned the collapsing psychedelic styles of Fried in favour of a crisp, punchier and more structured sound, drawing partially on Cope's professed love for Detroit heavy rock acts such as early Alice Cooper. Early sessions were supervised by Ramones producer Ed Stasium and delivered the song "World Shut Your Mouth" (which became Cope's biggest solo hit, reaching #19 in the UK in 1986), "Pulsar" and "Spacehopper". The remaining album sessions were produced by Warne Livesey. The parent album was well received and generated two more singles, "Trampolene" and "Eve’s Volcano", but the fresh momentum did not last. Cope fell out with Callomon, and the Two-Car Garage band disintegrated as James Eller joined The The and Chris Whitten left for Paul McCartney’s band.

Cope played a red Gibson ES-335 12-string guitar strung with 9 strings (a single course of E, A and D strings, with the G, B and high E strings doubled) to get a fuller sound.  The distinctive electronic peal which punctuates "World Shut Your Mouth" is the start-up tone of Cope's main keyboard

Cope has subsequently described Saint Julian as not being one of his favourite albums, although he acknowledges that "it has its moments."

Track listing 

The above is the original UK track listing. For the US release, "World Shut Your Mouth" was placed at the beginning of the album, and "Spacehopper" moved to the slot between "Saint Julian" and "Pulsar".

2013 expanded edition 
The first disc of the expanded edition contains the ten tracks from the original album.
The tracks on the second disc were previously released as b-sides and extended remixes on 7-inch and 12-inch singles from Saint Julian.

Note

"I've Got Levitation" was originally recorded by The 13th Floor Elevators and "Non-Alignment Pact" by Pere Ubu.

Chart positions

Album cover
The album's cover was shot by English photographer Peter Ashworth, who said of the shoot, "The pose for the album cover was standing with his arms outstretched, as if being crucified. It was freezing. One of the coldest nights of the year. It took many hours for me and Bruno Tilley, the art director, to light the entire space with heavy duty parcan lights running from a generator truck just out of sight."

Personnel 
Julian Cope – vocals, 9-string rhythm guitar; (also performs pseudonymously as "Double DeHarrison" playing organ and Hohner Clavinet on most tracks and 'Oregon' guitar on "A Crack in the Clouds")
Donald Ross Skinner – electric & slide guitars, 'airhead' guitar & screams on "Spacehopper"
James Eller – bass guitar
Chris Whitten – drums
Warne Livesey – synthesizer, strings on "A Crack in the Clouds"
Paul Crockford – Ace Tone organ on "Planet Ride"
Richard Frost (credited as "Keith-Richard Frost") – string machine on "Saint Julian"
Kate St. John – cor anglais on "Saint Julian" & "A Crack in the Clouds"
Dee Lewis, Tessa Niles – chorus vocals on "Eve's Volcano", chorus agreement vocals on "Planet Ride"

Some sources, including a press release for his former band How We Live, say that future Marillion singer Steve Hogarth sang backing vocals on the album, although he is uncredited on the inlay.

 Technical
 Warne Livesey - production on "Trampolene", "Eve's Volcano", "Planet Ride", "Saint Julian", "Pulsar", "Screaming Secrets", "A Crack in the Clouds"
 Ed Stasium - production on "Shot Down", "Spacehopper", "World Shut Your Mouth"
 Felix Kendall - recorded by
 George Schilling - recorded by
 P. St. John Nettleton, Island Art - sleeve design
 Peter Ashworth - cover photography
 Lawrence Watson - inner photography

 Expanded edition disc 2
Production credits adapted from the original 7-inch and 12-inch releases.
 Julian Cope - production on "I've Got Levitation", "Umpteenth Unnatural Blues", "Warwick the Kingmaker", "Non-Alignment Pact", "Almost Beautiful Child (1 & 2)", "Transporting"; (credited pseudonymously as "Double De Harrison" on some tracks)
 Julian Cope & Donald Ross Skinner - production on "Disaster", "Mock Turtle"
 Tim Lewis and the group - production on "Pulsar Nx (Live)", "Shot Down (Live)"
 Warne Livesey - remix on "Trampolene (Warne Out Mix)"
 James Avery, Robert Reed - remix on "World Shut Your Mouth (Trouble Funk Mix)"
 Tom Lord-Alge - remix on "Eve's Volcano (Covered In Sin)/Vulcano Lungo (12" Remix)"

References 

1987 albums
Julian Cope albums
Island Records albums
Albums produced by Ed Stasium
Albums produced by Warne Livesey